Black Gold is a live album by American jazz musician Nina Simone recorded in 1969 at the Philharmonic Hall, New York City. She got a 1971 nomination for a Grammy Award for Best Female R&B Vocal Performance, but lost to Aretha Franklin.

The album is especially notable because it features the civil rights anthem song "To Be Young, Gifted and Black". The performance that night also included a calypso version of Leonard Cohen's "Suzanne" (which Simone had recorded on To Love Somebody), but there was no room for it on the album.

With the release of the album also came an LP called Come Together with Nina Simone. It was a recorded interview about the album. The questions were provided in written form, so that radio DJs could ask the questions and play Simone's recorded answers, as if she were in the studio.

Track listing

Personnel
Nina Simone – piano, vocals, arrangements
Emile Latimer – guitar, vocals on "Black Is the Color of My True Love's Hair"
Tom Smith – guitar
Weldon Irvine – organ
Don Alias – drums, percussion
Jumma Santos – congas, percussion

Technical
Ed Begley - recording engineer
Jack Medkiff - cover design

Charts

References 

1970 live albums
Nina Simone live albums
Albums arranged by Nina Simone
RCA Victor live albums